Oecanthus niveus, known generally as the narrow-winged tree cricket or snowy tree cricket, is a species of tree cricket in the family Gryllidae, which includes all crickets. First noted by Swedish Entomologist Charles de Geer in 1773 by a Pennsylvanian Specimen, it is found primarily in Eastern North America south of Canada, and also in the Caribbean.

Identification 
Adult O. niveus are typically 13-16mm in length. They are a pale green with a pale orange head, and feature a dark streak running medially along the pronotum. On top of the head is an orange cap.

Habitat 
O. niveus can be found on broad-leaved trees, herbaceous plants, shrubbery, and in man-made orchards.

Song 
Like other members of the genus Oecanthus, the song of the male narrow-winged tree cricket varies in pitch and beats per minute depending the temperature, with warmer temperatures resulting in more rapid calling at a higher pitch. At 25°C, the pulse rate averages 71/sec at a frequency of 3.0 kHz. Songs are most often heard at night in late summer and autumn.

References

External links

 

niveus
Insects of the Caribbean
Orthoptera of North America
Insects described in 1773
Taxa named by Charles De Geer
Articles created by Qbugbot